Chandra Singh Garhwali was an Indian soldier.

Personal life 
He was born in December 25, 1891 and died in October 1, 1979. He is remembered in Indian history for refusing to open fire on unarmed pathans who were fighting for freedom. He lived with Mahatma Gandhi in Sabarmati Ashram for a short time.

Honors 

In 23 April 1994, India Post honored him by issuing stamp on him.
Government medical college Veer Chandra Singh Garhwali Government Institute of Medical Science and Research is named after him.
Agricultural university Veer Chandra Singh Garhwali Uttarakhand University of Horticulture and Forestry is named after him.
In 2022, Former Union Minister of Education and Chief Minister of Uttarakhand Ramesh Pokhriyal "Nishank" wrote biography on him which was published by National Book Trust.
In 2021, his statue was unveiled by Defence Minister of India, Rajnath Singh.
In 2014, Kishore Upadhyaya demanded to Harish Rawat for installation of his statue in Dehradun.
A scheme in Uttarakhand "Veer Chandra Singh Garhwali Tourism Self Employment Scheme" is named after him.

References 

1891 births
1979 deaths
Indian military personnel